Estelle Raffai (born 6 February 1998 in Longjumeau) is a French sprinter competing primarily in the 200 metres. She represented her country at the 2017 World Championships reaching the semifinals. In addition, she won two medals at the 2016 World U20 Championships.

International competitions

Personal bests

Outdoor
100 metres – 11.51 (+1.0 m/s, Châteauroux 2016)
200 metres – 23.05 (+1.9 m/s, Antony 2017)
400 metres – 53.71 (Nice 2017)

Indoor
60 metres – 7.40 (Eaubonne 2017)
200 metres – 23.57 (Eaubonne 2016)

References

1998 births
Living people
Sportspeople from Essonne
French female sprinters
French sportspeople of Ivorian descent
World Athletics Championships athletes for France
People from Longjumeau
Athletes (track and field) at the 2018 Mediterranean Games
Mediterranean Games gold medalists for France
Mediterranean Games medalists in athletics
21st-century French women